Dennis Jernigan is a singer-songwriter of contemporary Christian music.  He is native to Oklahoma, and headquarters a music-based Christian ministry from there. Jernigan now lives in Muskogee, Oklahoma, with his wife and their nine children. 

Jernigan is a graduate of Oklahoma Baptist University.

Awards 
Jernigan was inducted into the Oklahoma Music Hall of Fame in 2018.

Personal life 
A primary source of inspiration for Jernigan's message and music is an experience he describes as his deliverance from homosexuality. Jernigan states that this began during a 2nd Chapter of Acts concert in Norman, Oklahoma. Jernigan believes his prior identification as homosexual was related to an erroneous childhood perception that he had been rejected by his father.  

Following the experience at the concert, Jernigan developed a ministry based on his personal experience, which he shares at churches and other locations around the world. In a concert at Wynne Baptist Church, Jernigan stated that he does not wish to be labeled as "ex-gay", but instead as "reborn" or as "[God's] new creation."

Documentary film 
Jernigan is the subject of the 2014 film Sing Over Me, a documentary covering his career and struggle with homosexuality. The film was written and directed by Jacob Kindberg.

Creative collaborations 
Jernigan has recorded with Natalie Grant, Twila Paris, Ron Kenoly and Rebecca St. James.

Discography 

 See the King (1988)
 Lift Up the Standard (1988)
 At The Name Of Jesus (1988)
 We Are The Army (1989)
 There's Coming a Day (1991)
 Break My Heart, O God (1991)
 Let It Rain (1992)
 I Belong to Jesus Vol I & II (1993)
 Free to Praise – the songs of Dennis Jernigan as recorded by the Metro Voices (1993)
 Like Christmas All Year 'Round (1994)
 Rompe Mi Corazon (Spanish Language ‘Break My Heart, O God’) (1995)
 I Will Trust You (1995)
 Hallelujah! Christ Jesus is Born (Christmas Musical) (1995)
 Celebrate Living (1996)
 A Mystery of Majesty (1997)
 David (1999)
 This Is My Destiny (1999)
 Help Me To Remember (2000)
 Worshipper's Collection, Vol. 1 (I Belong To Jesus Vol. 1 & 2) (2000)
 Worshipper's Collection, Vol. 2 (I Will Trust You & Break My Heart) (2000)
 Worshipper's Collection, Vol. 3 (Let It Rain & There's Coming A Day) (2000)
 Worshipper's Collection, Vol. 4 (Daddy's Song & No Life Too Small) (2000)
 Songs of Ministry (2000)
 We Will Worship (Worship Musical)(2000)
 I Surrender (2001)
 Giant Killer: Heart Like David (includes 2nd CD – The Collection Vol. 1) (2002)
 Enter In – 12 new songs of Praise & Worship from New Community Church (2002)
 Jernigan Family Christmas (2003)
 I Salute You (2004)
 Songs of Freedom for Women (2005)
 Songs of Freedom for Men (2005)
 Hands Lifted High (2005)
 Daddy's Song (re-release) (2005)
 I Will Be There (2006)
 Carols Made New (2007)
 I Cry Holy (2007)
 Kingdom Come (2008)
 Live at White Oak DVD (2010)
 Forty Days & Forty Nights (2010)
 Here In Your Presence (2010)
 Hymns I (2011)
 Days of Awe (2013)
 First Love (2016)
 Middle of Nowhere (2020)

See also

 Ex-gay movement

References

External links 
 
 Dennis Jernigan Speaks at OBU‘Beyond the Hill’ Chapel: October 27, 2006
All in All Church website

1959 births
Living people
People from Sapulpa, Oklahoma
People from Muskogee, Oklahoma
Musicians from Oklahoma
Oklahoma Baptist University alumni
People self-identified as ex-gay
Performers of contemporary Christian music
Christian writers
American performers of Christian music
LGBT Protestants